Sannia may refer to:
Achille Sannia (1822–1892), Italian mathematician and politician
Gustavo Sannia Italian mathematician
Marisa Sannia Italian singer